Bungalow Heaven is a neighborhood in Pasadena, California named for the more than 800 small craftsman homes built there from 1900 to 1930, most of which still stand. Much of the area became a landmark district in 1989 and annual historic home tours have been conducted in Bungalow Heaven every year since then.

Landmarks
The rough borders of the landmark district are Washington Boulevard to the north, Orange Grove Boulevard to the south, Mentor Avenue to the west, and N. Chester Avenue to the east. The entire neighborhood is typically extended to Lake Avenue to the west and Hill Avenue to the east.

All commercial development lies just outside the landmark area, on Lake Avenue and (to a small extent) Washington Boulevard. At the center of the neighborhood is McDonald Park.

Education
Bungalow Heaven is served by Longfellow and Jefferson Elementary Schools, Eliot Middle School, and Pasadena High School.

Transportation
Bungalow Heaven is served by Metro Local lines 256 and 662, as well as Pasadena Transit routes 20, 31, and 32.

See also
Bungalow court, a style of multi-family housing developed in Pasadena in the 1910s

References

External links

Neighborhood Association home page

National Register of Historic Places in Pasadena, California
Neighborhoods in Pasadena, California
Historic districts on the National Register of Historic Places in California